The 61st District of the Iowa House of Representatives in the state of Iowa.

Current elected officials
Timi Brown-Powers is the representative currently representing the district.

Past representatives
The district has previously been represented by:
 Don D. Alt, 1971–1973
 Richard L. Byerly, 1973–1983
 Clay R. Spear, 1983–1993
 Johnie Hammond, 1993–1995
 Cecelia Burnett, 1995–1999
 Jane Greimann, 1999–2003
 Jo Oldson, 2003–2013
 Anesa Kajtazović, 2013–2015
 Timi Brown-Powers, 2015–present

References

061